Phimophis guianensis, also known commonly as Troschel's Pampas snake, is a species of snake in the subfamily Dipsadinae of the family Colubridae.
The species is endemic to South America.

Geographic range
Phimophis guianensis has been reported from Brazil, Colombia, French Guiana, Guyana, Panama, Suriname, and Venezuela.

Habitat

Description

Reproduction
Phimophis guianensis is oviparous.

References

Further reading
Cope ED (1860). "Catalogue of Colubridæ in the Museum of the Academy of Natural Sciences of Philadelphia. I. Calamarinæ". Proc. Acad. Nat. Sci. Philadelphia 12: 74–79. (Phimophis, new genus, p. 79).
Freiberg M (1982). Snakes of South America. Hong Kong: T.F.H. Publications. 189 pp. . (Genus Phimophis, p. 107).
Griffin LE (1916). "A Catalog of the Ophidia from South America at Present (June, 1916) Contained in the Carnegie Museum with Descriptions of some New Species". Memoirs of the Carnegie Museum 7 (3): 163–228 + Plate XXVIII. (Rhinostoma guianense, p. 214).

Dipsadinae
Reptiles of Brazil
Reptiles of Colombia
Reptiles of French Guiana
Reptiles of Guyana
Reptiles of Panama
Reptiles of Suriname
Reptiles of Venezuela